Odstock Down is a 12.1 hectare biological Site of Special Scientific Interest in Wiltshire, England, above the village of Odstock.  It was notified in 1975.

Sources
 Natural England citation sheet for the site (accessed 7 April 2022)

External links
 Natural England website (SSSI information)

Sites of Special Scientific Interest in Wiltshire
Sites of Special Scientific Interest notified in 1975